Pierre Barouh (born Élie Pierre Barouh; 19 February 1934 – 28 December 2016) was a French writer-composer-singer best known for his work on Claude Lelouch's film A Man and a Woman as an actor and the lyricist/singer for Francis Lai's music score.

Early life and music 
Barouh was born in Paris and along with his brother, Albert, and sister, was raised in Levallois-Perret. Their parents were Turkish-Jewish stallholders selling fabrics. During the Second World War, their parents hid them from the Nazis; Pierre and his sister in Montournais and Albert in la Limouzinière. During these years Élie, baptised Pierre, lived at La Grèlerie, the home of Hilaire and Marie Rocher, who had two sons. From this time, he drew inspiration for songs like "À bicyclette", "Des ronds dans l'eau" and "Les Filles du dimanche".

After the war, he was briefly a sports journalist for Paris-Presse-Intransigeant and also played for the national volleyball B team in the 1950s. He spent some months in Portugal and discovered Brazilian music. He visited Brazil in 1959 and on his return to Paris came to know Brazilian writers and composers of bossa nova.

With his first earnings he bought the mill, la Morvient, by the river in Le Boupère in the Vendée where he had spent part of his childhood. There he established a recording studio and welcomed other artists, using it to advance the talent of others and creating his own label Saravah in 1965. With the label, he wished to mix musicians and styles, to multiply musical encounters. He worked with Pierre Akendengué, Areski Belkacem, Brigitte Fontaine, Nana Vasconcelos, Gérard Ansaloni, Jacques Higelin, Alfred Panou, Maurane, David McNeil, and Elis Regina.

Soon after the label's creation, Barouh realised that he was not a manager and so entrusted management to a teenage friend he had known when he was 15 playing volleyball. However, in 1972, he discovered that this friend had stolen 1,500,000 francs by means which prevented Barouh from being able to get any of it back, as he "had given him everything: signatures, etc".

Cinema and theatre
As an actor, he played the role of the gypsy leader in the film D'ou viens-tu Johnny? and appeared in Lelouch's Une fille et des fusils. As writer/performer he had success with La Plage – immortalised by Marie Laforêt and the guitarist Claude Ciari -, Tes dix-huit ans and Monsieur de Furstenberg. He shot a documentary on the beginnings of bossa nova with his longtime friend Baden Powell de Aquino.

In 1966, he participated in the film A Man and a Woman which won the Palme d'Or at the 1966 Festival de Cannes. He married the actress Anouk Aimée the same year; they divorced three years later.

Barouh died in the Hôpital Cochin in Paris from an infarction on 28 December 2016, at the age of 82. He was buried a week later at Montmartre Cemetery.

Discography

Studio albums 
 Pierre Barouh (1966) (also released as Vivre) – FR #15
 Viking bank (1977)
 Le pollen (1982)
 Sierras (1984)
 Noël (1991)
 Itchi go Itchi e – Une rencontre, une occasion (1998)
 Daltonien (2007)

Live albums 
 Dites 33 (Volume 2) (with Yasuaki Shimizu and the Moonriders) (2001) (concert at the Espace Pierre Cardin, Paris on 15 February 1983)

Soundtrack albums 
 A Man and a Woman ("Un homme et une femme") (with Frances Lai and Nicole Croisille) (1967) – FR #15, NOR #4
 13 jours en France (with Francis Lai and Nicole Croisille) (1969) – FR #4
 Ça va, ça vient (1971)
 Au Kabaret de la dernière chance (with Anita Vallejo, Oscar Castro and the Aleph Theatre troupe) (1992)

Compilation albums 
 Saudade (Un Manque Habité) (2001)
 Les Années Disc'AZ – L'intégrale Des Chansons (2008)
 60 ans de chansons à des titres Divers (parfois Dit Vert) sur l'humain et ce qui l'entoure (2012)

Production credits

Albums 
 Brigitte Fontaine est... folle ! by Brigitte Fontaine (1968)
 Comme à la radio by Brigitte Fontaine, Areski Belkacem and the Art Ensemble of Chicago (1969)
Higelin & Areski by Jacques Higelin and Areski Belkacem (1969)
 Chante Jean-Roger Caussimon by Jean-Roger Caussimon (1970)
 Un beau matin by Areski Belkacem (1971)
 Brigitte Fontaine by Brigitte Fontaine (1972)
 Moshi by Barney Wilen (1972)
 Chorus by Michel Roques (1972)
 David McNeil by David McNeil (1972)
 Je ne connais pas cet homme by Brigitte Fontaine and Areski Belkacem (1973)
Jean-Roger Caussimon by Jean-Roger Caussimon (1973)
Nandipo by Pierre Akendengué (1974)
Nana, Nelson Angelo, Novelli by Naná Vasconcelos, Nelson Angelo and Novelli (1975)
Growing Up by Chic Streetman (1975)
Dreams by Steve Lacy (1975)
J’ai déjà fait mon arche, j’attends les animaux by David McNeil (1975)
Afrika Obota by Pierre Akendengué (1976)
Jeunes Années by Jean-Philippe Goude and Olivier Colé (1976)
Shakespeare Says by Champion Jack Dupree (1976)
Schumann – Sonate Op.11 / Ravel – Miroirs by Håkon Austbø (1977)
À l'amour comme à la guerre by Philippe Léotard (1990)
Voce a Mano by Allain Leprest and Richard Galliano (1992)
Sur les quais by Daniel Mille (1993)
Mes plus grands succès by Fred Poulet (1995)
De la Scarpe à la Seine by Françoise Kucheida (1995)
Encore cédé by Fred Poulet (1996)
La mémoire du vent by Bïa Krieger (1997)
Le Bonheur by Brigitte Fontaine and Areski Belkacem (1997)
En revenant du bal by Gérard Pierron (1997)
Ces moments là by Aram Sédèfian (1997) (co-produced with Bertrand Mougin)
Le Funambule by Daniel Mille (1997)
Les heures tranquilles by Daniel Mille (1998)
Cris de coeur by Françoise Kucheida (1998)
Sources by Bïa Krieger (2000)
Et s'il était deux fois by Eric Guilleton (2000)
Improvisations by Étienne Brunet and Fred Van Hove (2001)
Le Trio Camara by Le Trio Camara (2001) (co-produced with Yves Chamberland)

Non-album singles 
 "Simple routine" by Joël Favreau (1969)
 "I Love the Queen" by Jacques Higelin (1971)
 "Nini" by Jacques Higelin (1971)
 "Jamai-ai-ai-ai-ai-ais" by Brigitte Fontaine (1972)
 " Un jour, un papillon" by Joël Favreau (1972)
"La Transatlantique" by Dominique Barouh (1972)
"Likwala" by Pierre Akendengué (1975)
"Femmes parmi les femmes" by Françoise Hardy (1975)

Filmography

References

External links 
 

1934 births
2016 deaths
Male actors from Paris
French male film actors
French singer-songwriters
French film score composers
French male singers
French people of Turkish-Jewish descent
French male film score composers
French male singer-songwriters